Haydn is a crater on Mercury. It has a diameter of 251 kilometers. Its name was adopted by the International Astronomical Union (IAU) in 1976. Haydn is named for the Austrian composer Joseph Haydn, who lived from 1732 to 1809.

Haydn is south of the larger basin Raphael.

References

Impact craters on Mercury
Crater